Jacob Glatstein (1896–1971) yiddish יעקב גלאטשטיין was a Polish-born American poet and literary critic who wrote in the Yiddish language. His name is also spelled Yankev Glatshteyn or Jacob Glatshteyn.

Early life
Glatstein was born August 20, 1896, in Lublin, Poland. Although his family identified with the Jewish Enlightenment movement, he received a traditional education until the age of 16 and an introduction to modern Yiddish literature. In 1914, due to increasing anti-semitism in Lublin, he immigrated to New York City, where his uncle lived. He worked in sweatshops while studying English. He started to study law at New York University in 1918. He worked briefly at teaching before switching to journalism. He married in 1919.

Career

In 1920, together with Aaron Glanz-Leyles (1889–1966) and N. B. Minkoff (1898–1958), Glatstein established the Inzikhist (Introspectivist) literary movement and founded the literary organ In Sich. The Inzikhist credo rejected metered verse and declared that non-Jewish themes were a valid topic for Yiddish poetry. His books of poetry include Jacob Glatshteyn (1921) and A Jew from Lublin (1966). He was also a regular contributor to the New York Yiddish daily Morgen-Zhurnal and the Yiddisher Kemfer in which he published a weekly column entitled "In Tokh Genumen" (The Heart of the Matter).

Glatstein was interested in exotic themes, and in poems that emphasized the sound of words. He traveled to Lublin in 1934 and this trip gave him insight into the growing possibility of war in Europe. After this trip, his writings returned to Jewish themes and he wrote pre-Holocaust works that eerily foreshadowed coming events. After the Second World War, he became known for passionate poems written in response to the Holocaust, but many of his poems also evoke golden memories and thoughts about eternity.

Glatstein died on November 19, 1971, in New York City.

Awards
He won acclaim as an outstanding figure of mid-20th-century American Yiddish literature only later in life, winning the Louis Lamed Prize in 1940 for his works of prose, and again in 1956 for a volume of collected poems titled From All My Toil.

Selected works

Untitled book of poems in Yiddish, 1921;
Free Verse (Freie Fersen, 1926);
When Yash Set Out (Venn Yash Is Gefuhrn, 1938) resulted from his 1934 trip to Lublin;
Homecoming at Twilight (Venn Yash Is Gekumen, 1940), another work reflecting his 1934 trip to Lublin;
Emil un Karl, a book published in 1940 and written for children. The book is about two boys in pre-World War II Vienna: Karl, a Christian from a Socialist family, and his friend Emil, a Jew. Glatstein wanted children to understand the changes taking place in Europe, where Vienna was no longer the same Vienna ("vienn is shoyn nisht di aygene vienn fun amol").;
The Joy of the Yiddish Word (Die Freid fun Yiddishen Vort, 1961); and
A Jew of Lublin (A Yid fun Lublin, 1966)
The Selected Poems of Jacob Glatstein (October House, 1973); translated from the Yiddish and with an Introduction by Ruth Whitman

References

Selected Poems of Yankev Glatshteyn, translated, edited, and with an introduction by Richard J. Fein (Philadelphia, 1987)

External links
Amos Goren, Kingdom of Jews
"Eretz Acheret" Magazine

1896 births
1971 deaths
American people of Polish-Jewish descent
Jewish American poets
Yiddish-language poets
20th-century poets
Congress Poland emigrants to the United States